The FIBA South American Under-17 Championship for Women is a basketball tournament held about every two years among the ten countries of South America and is organized in part by FIBA Americas. The tournament serves as a gateway to the FIBA Americas Under-18 Championship for Women.

Summaries

Performances by nation

Participation details

References

External links
Brazil history

Under-17
South
Basketball U17